Alashkert Stadium, is a football stadium in Yerevan, Armenia. It was known as Nairi Stadium until 2013 when it  was renamed Alashkert by the new owners. The stadium is located in Shengavit District, adjacent to Lake Yerevan, on the left bank of Hrazdan River.

Overview

Alashkert Stadium was built and opened in 1960 as Nairi Stadium, within the frames of the expansion of the Shengavit District, known as Spandaryan raion during that period.

With a capacity of 6,850 spectators, Alashkert Stadium is the home ground of FC Alashkert (formerly based in Martuni) of the Armenian Premier League. It became the property of the club in February 2013. By the end of the year, the old pitch was replaced with a new natural turf in accordance with the international standards.

According to the FC Alashkert chairman Bagrat Navoyan, the stadium will be either renovated or entirely rebuilt by 2020, with a  possible expansion of the capacity up to 10,000.

References

External links
The stadium's page at FC Alashkert official website

Football venues in Armenia
Multi-purpose stadiums in Armenia
Sports venues in Yerevan
FC Alashkert